Kazakhstan competed at the 2022 World Athletics Championships in Eugene, Oregon from 15 to 24 July 2022. Kazakhstan had entered 12 athletes.

Medalists

Results

Men
Track and road events

Women
Track and road events

Field events

References

Kazakhstan
World Championships in Athletics
2022